This is a list of the first minority male lawyer(s) and judge(s) in Delaware. It includes the year in which the men were admitted to practice law (in parentheses). Also included are other distinctions such as the first minority men in their state to graduate from law school or become a political figure.

Firsts in Delaware's history

Lawyers 

First Jewish American male: Aaron Finger (1912)  
First African American male: Louis L. Redding (1929)

State judges 

First Jewish American male: Aaron Finger (1912) in 1917  
 First African American male: Sidney Clark (1956) in 1961  
First African American male (Delaware Superior Court): Joshua W. Martin III in 1982

Federal judges 
First African American male (U.S. District Court for the District of Delaware): Gregory M. Sleet (1976) in 1998

United States Attorney 

First African American male: Gregory M. Sleet (1976)

Delaware State Bar Association 

 Joshua W. Martin III: First African American male to serve as the President of the Delaware State Bar Association

Firsts in local history 
 Leonard Williams (1959): First African American male to serve on the Wilmington Municipal Court (1966) [New Castle County, Delaware]

See also 
 List of first minority male lawyers and judges in the United States

Other topics of interest 

 List of first women lawyers and judges in the United States
 List of first women lawyers and judges in Delaware

References 

 
Minority, Delaware, first
Minority, Delaware, first
Delaware lawyers
law